John Dominique LaMothe  (June 8, 1868 – October 25, 1928) was missionary bishop of what is now the Episcopal Diocese of Hawaii from 1921 to 1928.

Biography
LaMothe was born on the Isle of Man, on June 8, 1865. At age 17, his father sent him to the United States to work on a farm in Virginia. After a year, he went to Wyoming to work on a ranch. He later returned to Virginia and entered Virginia Theological Seminary. After his ordination in 1895, LaMothe served in several parishes. In 1901 he became an assistant minister of the historic Epiphany Church in Washington D.C. under rector Randolph McKim. After a few years he became Epiphany's first associate rector. He also served in Saint Paul, Minnesota, New Orleans and rector of Ascension church in Baltimore. On October 29, 1920 he was elected Bishop of Hawaii on the third ballot by the House of Bishops. He was consecrated bishop on June 29, 1921. LaMonthe died while attending the 1928 General Convention of the Episcopal Church in Washington D.C. He was buried in Ivy Hill Cemetery in Alexandria, Virginia.

References

External links 
Genealogical newsletter notice

1868 births
1928 deaths
Episcopal bishops of Hawaii
People from Ramsey, Isle of Man
Manx emigrants to the United States
Virginia Theological Seminary alumni